Charles or Charlie Savage may refer to:

Real people
 Charles Savage (banker) (fl. 1740s), governor of the Bank of England, 1745–1747
 Charles Savage (beachcomber) (died 1813), sailor and beachcomber known for his exploits on the islands of Fiji
 Charles Roscoe Savage (1832–1909), British-born landscape and portrait photographer 
 Charles R. Savage  (1906–1976),  U.S. Representative from Washington
 Charlie Savage (author) (born 1975), New York Times reporter and Pulitzer Prize winner in 2007
 Charlie Savage (footballer) (born 2003), Welsh association footballer
 Charlie Savage (novel), a 2019 novel by Irish writer Roddy Doyle

Fictional characters
 Charles Savage, a fictional character in Hollyoaks, later Dr. Charles S'avage
 Charlie Savage, a protagonist of the novel of the same name by Roddy Doyle